Sone Station (曽根駅) is the name of two train stations in Japan:

 Sone Station (Hyōgo)
 Sone Station (Osaka)